The Battle of Bacho was a battle between the Royal Thai Army and the RKK insurgency where the latter attacked a military base in Bacho District. At least 16 RKK insurgents, including a commander were killed while none of the Thai military defenders of the base were injured.

Battle
On February 13, 2013, the RKK attacked a marine base, Bacho District in Narathiwat Province. Due to receiving clues about the plans to attack the stronghold in the last few days, Somkiat Pholprayoon had reinforced the base. With the support of the Thai Navy SEALs and the 1st Reconnaissance Battalion, the Thai military base was able to be defended while losing no men while the RKK lost 16 deaths.

Aftermath
After the event, Somkiat Pholprayoon expressed regret at the lives lost in the clash.

References

Battles involving Thailand
South Thailand insurgency
2013 in Thailand
Battles in 2013